The Yang Ma Tower, formerly known as Taichung Condominium Tower, is a 41-story,  tall residential skyscraper located in Xitun District, Taichung, Taiwan. Construction of the skyscraper began in 2014 and it was completed in 2019. As of December 2020, it is the second tallest residential skyscraper in Taichung, the 8th tallest building in Taichung and 28th tallest in Taiwan.

Design 
The tower is jointly designed by the American architectural firm Richard Meier & Partners and HOY Architects. The building is divided into two north–south towers, connected through a central core area. The main façade structure of the South Tower is a white translucent glass curtain wall, which allows natural light to enter the building and also allows residents to maintain privacy. There is a public sky garden on the 16th floor of the North Tower, which serves as a viewing platform.

See also 
 List of tallest buildings in Taiwan
 List of tallest buildings in Taichung
 Taichung's 7th Redevelopment Zone
 55 Timeless

References

2019 establishments in Taiwan
Residential skyscrapers in Taiwan
Skyscrapers in Taichung
Taichung's 7th Redevelopment Zone
Apartment buildings in Taiwan
Residential buildings completed in 2019